The 1962 NCAA Skiing Championships were contested at the Squaw Valley Ski Resort in Olympic Valley, California at the ninth annual NCAA-sanctioned ski tournament to determine the individual and team national champions of men's collegiate alpine skiing, cross-country skiing, and ski jumping in the United States.

Denver, coached by Willy Schaeffler, captured their sixth national championship (and second consecutive), edging out rival Colorado in the team standings.

Scheduled as the opening event on Thursday, the downhill was postponed to Saturday due to heavy snowfall, and the jumping moved to Sunday.

Utah's Jim Gaddis reclaimed the alpine title he won two years earlier; he won the slalom, and was runner-up in the downhill, just a tenth of a second behind.

Venue

This year's championships were held March 22–25 in California at Squaw Valley in Olympic Valley. Two years earlier, Squaw Valley had hosted the 1960 Winter Olympics.

The ninth NCAA championships, these were the first in California and the second in the Lake Tahoe area of the Sierra Nevada (1954 in Reno, Nevada).

Team scoring

Individual events

Four events were held, which yielded seven individual titles.
Thursday: Downhill (postponed to Saturday)
Friday: Slalom
Saturday: Downhill, Cross Country
Sunday: Jumping

See also
List of NCAA skiing programs

References

NCAA Skiing Championships
NCAA Skiing Championships
NCAA Skiing Championships
NCAA Skiing Championships
NCAA Skiing Championships
NCAA Skiing Championships
NCAA Skiing Championships
Skiing in California